Escuadrón 201 is a metro station in Mexico City, Mexico. It is located in the city's eastern Iztapalapa delegación, close to the intersection of Eje 3 Oriente (Axis 3 - East) and Eje 8 Sur (Axis 8 - South).

The station was named in honor of Escuadrón 201, the Mexican military aviation unit that assisted the United States in the Philippines during World War II.

The logo of the station is the insignia of Escuadrón 201.  It was opened on 20 July 1994.

Ridership

References

External links 
 

Mexico City Metro stations in Iztapalapa
Mexico City Metro Line 8 stations
Railway stations opened in 1994
1994 establishments in Mexico